This is a list of places which are located in Czech Republic, Slovakia and Germany named in honor of the 5th President of Czechoslovakia Klement Gottwald.

Cities and districts

Czech Republic 
Gottwaldov (1949–1989) — Zlín

Slovakia 
Gottwaldova štvrť (1969-1989), — now Sídlisko Lány, Považská Bystrica

Streets and squares

Slovakia 
Ulica Klementa Gottwalda (Klement Gottwald Street), – now Štefánikova Ulica, Košice
Gottwaldovo námestie (Gottwald Square), – now Námestie Slobody, Bratislava
Gottwaldova (?–1990) (Gottwald Street), – now Masarykova ulica, Michalovce
Gottwaldova (Gottwald Street), – now 17. novembra, Prešov
Gottwaldova (Gottwald Street), – now Študentská, Trnava
Gottwaldovo námestie (Gottwald Square), – now Trojičné námestie, Trnava
Gottwaldova ulica (Gottwald Street), now M.R.Štefánika, Veľký Krtíš
Gottwaldova ulica (Gottwald Street), now Štefánikova ulica, Žilina
Gottwaldova (Gottwald Street), Jelka
Gottwaldova (Gottwald Street), Šoporňa
Klementa Gottwalda (Klement Gottwald Street), Želovce

Czech Republic 
Gottwaldova ulice (Gottwald Street), – now 28. října, Zlín
Gottwaldova (1949–1990) (Gottwald Street), – now Cejl, Brno
Gottwaldovo nábřeží (Gottwald Embankment), – now Smetanovo nábřeží, Prague
Gottwaldova ulice (Gottwald Street), – now Churchillova, Ústí nad Labem
Gottwaldova ulice (Gottwald Street), – now Palachova, Poděbrady
ulice Gottwaldova (Gottwald Street), – now Jablunkovská, Třinec
Gottwaldova (Gottwald Street), – now Přemyslova, Kralupy nad Vltavou
Gottwaldova ulice (Gottwald Street), – now Obránců míru, Uničov
Gottwaldovo náměstí (Gottwald Square), – now Ulrichovo náměstí, Hradec Králové

Places

Czech Republic 
Gottwaldova (metro stanice) (Gottwald Street (metro station), – now Vyšehrad, Prague

Statues

Slovakia 
Socha Klementa Gottwalda (1975–1989), Košice
Gottwaldovo súsošie (1980–1990), Bratislava

Czech Republic 
Pomník Klementa Gottwalda (1973–1990), Hradec Králové
Socha Klementa Gottwalda (1961–1989), Zlín
Socha Klementa Gottwalda (1981–1990), Palacký University Olomouc, Olomouc
Socha Klementa Gottwalda (1958–1990), Šumperk

Germany 
Statue von Klement Gottwald (?–1990s), Gundelfingen

References

Gottwald, Klement
Gottwald, Klement
Gottwald, Klement